One for All is the debut studio album by American hip hop group Brand Nubian, released on December 4, 1990, by Elektra Records. The album was highly acclaimed for its politically charged and socially conscious content. Sales never matched the wide acclaim — the album has only sold 350,000 copies as of May 2013 — but it has remained in print since its 1990 release. The album is mainly produced by Brand Nubian, but it also features production by Skeff Anselm, Stimulated Dummies, and Dave "Jam" Hall. The album's production contains many motifs of hip hop's golden age including James Brown-sampled breakbeats and funky R&B loops. The album is broken down track-by-track by Brand Nubian in Brian Coleman's book Check the Technique.

Reception

Commercial performance 
One for All charted at number 130 on the U.S. Billboard 200, spending 28 weeks on the chart. It also reached number 34 on the Billboard Top Black Albums chart, on which it spent 40 weeks. Alex Henderson of Allmusic writes of the album's commercial performance, "In black neighborhoods of New York and Philadelphia, [One for All] was actually a bigger seller than many of the platinum gangsta rap releases outselling it on a national level."

Critical response 

One for All was a critical success upon its release. Los Angeles Times writer Steve Hochman called it "an impressive debut" and commended "the power of the lessons delivered with style and creativity", stating "There's a playful ease to this record recalling the colorful experiments of De La Soul, and there's as much sexual boasting as Islamic teaching." Jon Pareles of The New York Times described the album as "a peculiar merger of sexual boasting, self-promotion and occasional political perspective." J the Sultan of The Source gave it the publication's maximum five-mike rating and wrote that it "overflows with creativity, originality, and straight-up talent. [...] the type of record that captures a whole world of music, rhymes and vibes with a completely new style." In his consumer guide for The Village Voice, critic Robert Christgau gave One for All an A− rating, indicating "the kind of garden-variety good record that is the great luxury of musical micromarketing and overproduction. Anyone open to its aesthetic will enjoy more than half its tracks." He commented that "most black-supremacist rap sags under the burden of its belief system just like any other ideological music," but quipped, "This Five Percenter daisy-age is warm, good-humored, intricately interactive—popping rhymes every sixth or eighth syllable, softening the male chauvinism and devil-made-me-do-it with soulful grooves and jokes fit for a couch potato."

It has since received retrospective acclaim from publications such as AllMusic, Rolling Stone, and ego trip. AllMusic editor Alex Henderson complimented the group's "abstract rapping style" and stated, "On the whole, Nubian's Nation of Islam rhetoric isn't as overbearing as some of the recordings that other Five Percenters were delivering at the time." In The New Rolling Stone Album Guide (2004), music journalist Peter Relic stated, "they had a sobering lyrical style equally effective whether promoting African-American consciousness ('Concerto in X Minor') or telling hoes to chill (the Edie Brickell-sampling 'Slow Down')". Trouser Press writer Jeff Chang praised the group's "marriage of party groove and polemical grit" and cited the album as "a high point of East Coast hip-hop".

Accolades
In 1998, the album was selected as one of The Sources 100 Best Rap Albums and its lead single "Slow Down" was featured on the publication's 100 Best Hip-Hop Singles of All Time list. One year later, Rolling Stone placed it on a list of the Essential Recordings of the 90's. It was additionally ranked #2 on ego trip'''s 1999 list of "Hip Hop's 25 Greatest Albums by Year (1980–98)".

Track listing

 Personnel 
Credits for One for All adapted from Allmusic.

 Skeff Anselm – producer
 Carol Bobolts – design
 Brand Nubian – producer
 Geeby Dajani – mixing, producer
 John Gamble – mixing, producer
 Grand Puba – producer
 D. Hall – mixing, producer
 Dante Ross – executive producer, mixing, producer
 Mark Seliger – photography

Charts

Singles

 Notes 

 References 
 

 External links 
 One for All at Discogs
 One for All — Classic Material: The Hip-Hop Album Guide One for All — Marooned: The Next Generation of Desert Island Discs New Music Preview – Brand Nubian — Spin''

1990 debut albums
Brand Nubian albums
Elektra Records albums
Albums produced by Dante Ross
Albums produced by John Gamble (record producer)